Urlicht / Primal Light is an album by pianist Uri Caine featuring compositions by Gustav Mahler recorded in 1996 and released on the Winter & Winter label in 1997.

Reception

In his review for Allmusic, Steve Loewy said "Very few, if any, attempts to merge classical music and jazz have succeeded. Somehow, jazz pianist Uri Caine's masterful and magnificent interpretations of selected works of the 19th century classical composer Gustav Mahler work remarkably well... He does not simply "jazz up" Mahler, which would mock the greatness of his works. Instead, he worms himself inside the songs and harmonies and uses them as a starting point to create a related, but new, synthesis of his music. Jewish folk melodies, cantorial renditions, free jazz, and classical violin are all merged in a whole that transcends the parts". Gramophone said "What Caine has done is much more radical and controversial than anything in, say, Jacques Loussier’s Bach. Each shard is given a bizarre new slant, which means relocating it to a Broadway show, a dinner-dance in the Catskills, a jazz concert or a rock venue".

Track listing
All compositions by Gustav Mahler
 "Symphony No. 5, Funeral March" – 5:52  
 "The Drummer Boy" – 5:45  
 "Now Will the Sun Rise as Brightly" – 1:50  
 "I Often Think They Have Merely Gone Out!" – 3:33  
 "Symphony No. 1 Titan" – 12:02  
 "Primal Light" – 2:31  
 "I Went Out This Morning Over the Countryside/Resurrection" – 6:54  
 "Symphony No. 5, Adagietto" – 10:35  
 "The Drunkard in Spring" – 7:50  
 "Who Thought Up This Song?" – 2:36  
 "The Farewell" – 12:59

Personnel
Uri Caine – piano
Dave Douglas – trumpet 
Josh Roseman – trombone 
Dave Binney – soprano saxophone 
Don Byron – clarinet 
Mark Feldman – violin 
Larry Gold – cello  
Danny Blume – guitar, electronics 
DJ Olive – turntables 
Michael Formanek – bass
Joey Baron – drums 
Aaron Bensoussan – hand drum, cantor 
Arto Lindsay, Dean Bowman – vocals

References

Winter & Winter Records albums
Uri Caine albums
1997 albums